= Downtown Circle =

General information
- Status: Proposed
- Type: Residential, commercial, public spaces
- Location: Dubai, United Arab Emirates
- Completed: 2040 (if completed)

Height
- Height: 550 m

Technical details
- Floor count: 50

Design and construction
- Architect: ZNera Space

Downtown Circle is a proposed megastructure in Dubai, United Arab Emirates. The project is designed by ZNera Space, an architecture firm based in Dubai. Downtown Circle would be a 550-meter-tall ring that would encircle the Burj Khalifa, the world's tallest skyscraper. The ring would be 3,000 meters in circumference and would house residential, commercial, and public spaces.

The project is designed to be sustainable and self-sufficient. The ring would be powered by renewable energy and would have a green belt that would provide food and oxygen for the residents. The ring would also have a system of canals and waterfalls that would help to cool the air and provide a habitat for wildlife.
